Green Cay National Wildlife Refuge, encompasses the 6 ha (14 acre) island of Green Cay lying midway between the town of Christiansted and Buck Island Reef National Monument, just north of Saint Croix in the United States Virgin Islands of the Caribbean. It is administered as part of the Caribbean Islands National Wildlife complex. There is a smaller "Green Cay" off the coast of Saint Thomas.

Wildlife

The wildlife refuge preserves habitat for the largest remaining population of the endangered Saint Croix ground lizard.  Much smaller populations of ground lizards live on nearby Protestant Cay and on Ruth Island. Its extirpation from the mainland of Saint Croix is generally attributed to the introduction of the small Indian mongoose.  In 2008, the National Park Service reintroduced the lizard to Buck Island, translocating 57 individuals from Green Cay.

Important Bird Area
Green Cay has, along with the nearby Southgate Coastal Reserve, been recognised as an Important Bird Area (IBA) by BirdLife International because they support populations of green-throated caribs, Antillean crested hummingbirds, American coots, brown pelicans, laughing gulls, least terns, royal terns, Caribbean elaenias and pearly-eyed thrashers.

See also
List of National Wildlife Refuges

References

External links
Green Cay National Wildlife Refuge homepage

National Wildlife Refuges of the United States in the Caribbean
Protected areas of the United States Virgin Islands
Uninhabited islands of the United States Virgin Islands
National Natural Landmarks in the United States Virgin Islands
National Register of Historic Places in the United States Virgin Islands
Protected areas established in 1977
1977 establishments in the United States Virgin Islands
Saint Croix, U.S. Virgin Islands
Important Bird Areas of the United States Virgin Islands
Seabird colonies